Sabz Daraq (also known as Sabzeh Daraq) is a village in Guzal Darreh Rural District, Soltaniyeh District, Abhar County, Zanjan Province, Iran. At the 2006 census, its population was 417, in 99 families.

References 

Populated places in Abhar County